Curtis Malik (born 26 July 1999 in Redhill) is an English professional squash player. As of October 2021, he was ranked number 113 in the world. His siblings Perry and Torrie are also professional squash players.

References

1999 births
Living people
English male squash players